The Game's Afoot (The Game's Afoot; or Holmes for the Holidays) is a play written by Ken Ludwig and published by Samuel French, Inc. on November 14, 2012, and which later won the Edgar Award for Best Play in 2012.

References 

Edgar Award-winning works
2012 plays